Charles Conrad Abbott (June 4, 1843 – July 27, 1919) was an American archaeologist and naturalist.

Biography
Abbott was born at Trenton, New Jersey, son of Timothy and Susan (Conrad) Abbott; grandson of Joseph and Anne (Rickey) Abbott, and a descendant of John and Anne (Mauleverer) Abbott, settlers, from England, in New Jersey in 1684. He studied medicine at the University of Pennsylvania School of Medicine. During the American Civil War, he served as a surgeon in the Union Army. He received his M.D. degree from University of Pennsylvania in 1865, but never entered into the practice of the profession.

In 1876, he announced the discovery, later confirmed by other archaeologists, of traces of human presence in the Delaware River Valley dating from the first or "Kansan" ice age, and inferentially from the pre-glacial period when humans are believed to have entered upon the North American continent. However, today the consensus of archaeologists is that most of Abbott's "Trenton Gravel Implements" date from the Middle Woodland period of about A.D. 300–900. From 1876 to 1889, he was assistant curator of the Peabody Museum in Cambridge, Massachusetts, to which he presented a collection of 20,000 archaeological specimens; he freely gave also to other archaeological collections. From 1890 to 1894 he served as the first curator of the University of Pennsylvania's newly organized Department of American Archaeology.

He was a corresponding member of the Boston Society of Natural History, a member of the American Philosophical Society of Philadelphia, and a fellow of the Royal Society of Antiquaries of the North in Copenhagen. In 1919 he died at the age of 76 years in Bristol, Pennsylvania, where he had moved after the burning of his New Jersey home a few years before.

Writings
His book Primitive Industry: Illustrations of the Hand-work in Stone, Bone, and Clay of the Native Races of the Northern Atlantic Seaboard of America (Salem, 1881) detailed the evidences of the presence of pre-glacial man in the Delaware Valley.  He was well known as a frequent contributor to the American Naturalist, Science, Nature, Science News, and Popular Science Monthly.  He also published many books on outdoor observation, such as A Naturalist's Rambles about Home (1884).

Bibliography
Catalogue of Vertebrate Animals of New Jersey (1868 - in Geology of New Jersey, ed. George H. Cook)
The Stone Age in New Jersey (1876)
Primitive Industry: or Illustrations of the Handiwork, in Stone, Bone and Clay, of the Native Races of the Northern Atlantic Seaboard of America (1881)
The Paleolithic Implements of the Valley of the Delaware (1881)
Upland and Meadow (1886)
Waste Land Wanderings (1887)
Days Out of Doors  (1889)
Outings at Odd Times (1890)
Recent Archaeological Explorations in the Valley of the Delaware (1892)
A Naturalists' Rambles About Home (1894 - 2nd Edition)
The Birds About Us (1894)
Travels in a Tree-Top (1894)
A Colonial Wooing (1895)
Notes of the Night And Other Outdoor Sketches (1896)
The Freedom of the Fields (1898)
Clear Skies and Cloudy (1899)
In Nature's Realm (1900)
Bird-Land Echoes (1904)
Rambles of an Idler (1906)
Archæologia Nova Cæsarea (1907–09)
Ten Years' Diggings in Lenape Land (1901–11)

See also
Ernest Volk

References

Bibliography

External links 

1843 births
1919 deaths
Union Army surgeons
American naturalists
American science writers
Writers from Trenton, New Jersey
Perelman School of Medicine at the University of Pennsylvania alumni
Harvard University staff
Members of the American Philosophical Society